Nick Kyrgios was the defending champion, but he did not participate this year. He played in Barcelona during this week.

Chung Hyeon won the title, defeating James McGee in the final, 6–3, 6–2.

Seeds

Draw

Finals

Top half

Bottom half

References
 Main Draw
 Qualifying Draw

Savannah Challenger - Singles